Herbert Grassler (born 26 May 1976) is an Austrian football manager and former footballer who played as a midfielder.

External links
 

1976 births
Living people
Austrian footballers
SK Sturm Graz players
LASK players
SV Ried players
Association football midfielders